The Prodigal Woman is an Argentine drama film directed by Mario Soffici and co-directed by Leo Fleider and Ralph Pappier. It stars Eva Duarte as a wasteful rich woman who has a social awakening. The film is based on a novel by Pedro Antonio de Alarcón.

The film was shot in 1945, in Córdoba and the San Miguel studios in Buenos Aires. It was Duarte's first leading role in a film and also her last film. It was to be released toward the end of 1945, but in the meantime Duarte married the presidential candidate Juan Perón. Her new position in Argentina's political life, and her considerable influence on her husband, made the film inappropriate for release, and it was postponed indefinitely. It was eventually released in Argentina on 16 August 1984.

Cast
 Eva Duarte
 Juan José Míguez
 Angelina Pagano
 Ernesto Raquén
 Ricardo Galache
 Francisco López Silva
 Enrique San Miguel
 Malisa Zini
 Alberto Closas
 Lidia Denis
 Pura Díaz
 Arsenio Perdiguero
 Mercedes Díaz
 Manuel Alcón
 Ricardo Talesnik
 Alfredo Almanza

References

External links

1984 drama films
1984 films
Argentine drama films
Films based on Spanish novels
Films based on works by Pedro Antonio de Alarcón
Films directed by Mario Soffici
Films directed by Ralph Pappier
Films shot in Argentina
Films scored by Alejandro Gutiérrez del Barrio
Films directed by Leo Fleider
1980s Argentine films